Blake Dean may refer to:

Blake Dean (baseball) (born 1988), college baseball coach
Blake Dean (Home and Away), fictional character on Australian soap opera Home and Away
Blake Dean (cricketer) (born 1987), captain coach of Queanbeyan District Cricket Club and player with ACT Comets and Sydney Thunder